"Irresistible" is a song written and recorded by the American rock band Fall Out Boy from their sixth studio album, American Beauty/American Psycho (2015). Initially released as the second promotional single from the album on January 5, 2015, it debuted at No. 77 in the US and No. 70 in the UK. In February 2015, it was released as the band's third UK single, and a music video was released on February 19.

A remix version featuring Demi Lovato, was released on October 16, 2015 (same day as her fifth studio album Confident) and peaked at No. 48 on the Billboard Hot 100. On October 30, another remix version, featuring vocals by Migos and production by Zaytoven, was included in the remixed album Make America Psycho Again.

Background
The song is the first track on Fall Out Boy's sixth studio album American Beauty/American Psycho, and it runs a length of three minutes and twenty seconds. The song was written by Fall Out Boy and produced by Butch Walker and Jake Sinclair. Bassist Pete Wentz compared the mood of the song to a scene in the biopic Sid and Nancy. "When I think of "Irresistible", it brings this image to my head, whether it's fictional or real, of Sid and Nancy in an alley, garbage raining down on them in an eternal spiral of romance and poison. Sometimes it's hard not to love what can hurt us the most."

Release and commercial performance
The song was released as a promotional digital download online on January 5, 2015, 15 days before the album's official US release on January 20. The day of the digital release, it reached the top of the iTunes download chart, which helped it debut and peak at No. 77 on the Billboard Hot 100 chart and No. 70 on the UK Singles Chart on the strength of digital downloads. In mid-February it was released as a UK single, following "Centuries" and "American Beauty/American Psycho" in the region. In the issue dated 27 October 2015, "Irresistible" re-entered the Billboard Hot 100 chart at No. 98 following its release as a US single, with a remix featuring Demi Lovato. It has since reached No. 48 given the single release. The song was used by WWE for their Extreme Rules PPV event and it is also featured in the promotional spots for the miniseries Heroes Reborn. As of February 25, Irresistible has sold over 500,000 copies in the US.

Critical reception
"Irresistible" has received positive reviews from music critics, with many commenting on the anthemic nature of the song. MTV wrote positively of the song, calling it a "frantic twist of desperation, confidence and sadism with a chugging guitar, anthemic trombones and a shout-it-at-the-top-of-your-lungs chorus. Idolator commented that the song was "stadium-rocking" and full of "horn-and-synth glory". Rolling Stone complimented the song as well, stating that it is "an arena-pop anthem about deadly love." Spin described the song as a "booming, brass-backed anthem." Music Times called the song reminiscent of "My Songs Know What You Did in the Dark (Light Em Up)".

Music videos
A music video was released on February 19, 2015, to accompany the UK single release. It was directed by Scantron and Mel Soria. With the video's editing resembling that of a VHS recording with "cheesy" editing, it features the band members wearing "embarrassing" sports fashion as they challenge professional basketball players into a basketball game. The struggling band is severely defeated in the match. There are several times when the members of the band almost score, and audience members cheer for them and display signs such as "Not bad Joe" and other similar slogans. Finally, the band scores once in the end. The end of the video includes a clip of the short film Bedussey from Clandestine Industries Presents: Release the Bats, stylistically the previous layer of the VHS tape which Irresistible taped over. The music video references Patrick Stump's hand being chopped off in the video for "The Phoenix".

The remix version, featuring Demi Lovato, was directed by Brendan Walter. The video starring Doug the Pug and references their previous videos, "Centuries", "Sugar, We're Goin Down", "Dance, Dance", "Uma Thurman" and the official video of "Irresistible".

A third video was released on January 5, 2016 for the version featuring Lovato. The video references the NSYNC music video for "It's Gonna Be Me" where the band members are dolls in a toy store. The Fall Out Boy dolls are rejected but form their own band. The video is directed by Wayne Isham and features cameo appearances by NSYNC members Chris Kirkpatrick and Joey Fatone.

Track listing
Digital download (remix)
"Irresistible"  – 3:25

Charts

Weekly charts

Year-end charts

Certifications

Release history

Promotional single

Official single

References

2014 songs
Fall Out Boy songs
Demi Lovato songs
Songs written by Pete Wentz
Songs written by Patrick Stump
Songs written by Joe Trohman
Songs written by Andy Hurley
2015 singles
Island Records singles
Song recordings produced by Butch Walker
Music videos directed by Wayne Isham